The School of Chemistry, University of Sydney is a school of the Faculty of Science at the University of Sydney.

Two Nobel Laureates are associated with the School: John Cornforth completed his undergraduate degree in the School, graduating in 1938 with First Class Honours and the University Medal; and Robert Robinson was appointed as the first Professor of Pure and Applied Organic Chemistry at the university in 1912.

History

The School of Chemistry was established as a part of the Faculty of Science in 1882. However, chemistry was taught at the University of Sydney since 1852. A purpose-built building was constructed on what was later named Science Road starting in 1888 and was completed in 1890. The building was designed largely by Archibald Liversidge, Professor of Chemistry and the first Dean of the Faculty of Science. The original Chemistry Building is now used by the Sydney Pharmacy School.

In 1945, a large fibro-cement building (known as "Tramsheds") was constructed for use by chemistry students until the current Chemistry Building opened in 1958. The current Chemistry Building is notable in architectural history as one of the first structures in Australia with a curtain wall design.

Centres and initiatives

Laboratory of Advanced Catalysis for Sustainability

The School of Chemistry is home to the Laboratory of Advanced Catalysis for Sustainability which is focused broadly on catalysis, sustainable processes and fuels, green chemistry, and organometallic chemistry. Other areas the group is interested in include batteries, nanoparticles, ionic liquids, biofuels, and nanostructured materials.

The research group is led by Prof. Thomas Maschmeyer and consists of ca. 20 researchers.

Centre of Excellence in Exciton Science

The School of Chemistry has a node of the Centre of Excellence in Exciton Science which is a research collaboration between the University of Melbourne, University of New South Wales, RMIT University, University of Sydney, and Monash University.

The Centre of Excellence in Exciton Science is focused on novel materials for the development of low-cost, high efficiency, light-harvesting devices. The research programme utilises high-throughput screening, single molecule photochemistry, and ultrafast spectroscopy.

Drug Discovery Initiative

The Drug Discovery Initiative (DDI) was launched in 2018 to develop new drugs by working with clinicians and industry in infectious diseases, cancer, inflammation, neurodegenerative disorders, and metabolic diseases. However, the DDI is not limited to these areas and its research has contributed to antibiotics, cardiovascular diseases, and other health issues.  Much of the research of the DDI uses facilities made available by Sydney Analytical such as X-ray scattering techniques and various types of spectroscopy, usually for characterisation of new drugs or proteins. Recent research within the DDI include Alzheimer's disease, malaria, and tuberculosis.

The current Academic Director of the DDI is Prof. Michael Kassiou.

Key Centre for Polymers and Colloids

The Key Centre for Polymers and Colloids (KCPC) is a research centre of the School of Chemistry established by the Australian Research Council Research Centres Program. While the KCPC is known for polymers and colloids, it comprises several groups that can specialise in different areas like self-assembly, virus mimics, emulsions, and surfactants. The KCPC has attracted various industry support such as Orica, Nuplex Industries, and others. Currently, faculty members involved in KCPC research are: A/Prof. Brian Hawkett, A/Prof. Chiara Neto, Dr. Mohammad Choucair, Prof. Greg Warr, Dr. Markus Muellner, and E/Prof. Les Copeland.

The current KCPC Director is A/Prof. Brian Hawkett.

Academics

Admission

Admission to the School of Chemistry's research programs is competitive. Generally, admission to the School of Chemistry Honours program requires a SCIWAM of at least 65 or equivalent. Each faculty member is limited to 2.5 full-time equivalent (FTE) Honours students to ensure adequate supervision where co-supervised projects count as 0.5 FTE for each faculty. As a result, admission for some projects is significantly more competitive than others.

The School of Chemistry offer postgraduate research degrees in the Doctor of Philosophy, Master of Philosophy, and Graduate Diploma in Science where admission is by application to the University of Sydney. Applications for funding and scholarships is a separate application but also to the University of Sydney, this is a competitive process and a successful candidate is typically offered a stipend and a scholarship to cover living expenses and tuition fees, respectively.

Rankings

The University of Sydney has typically performed well on the QS Chemistry Subject Ranking, where it was 30th in 2013, 42nd in 2014, 51-100th in 2015, 49th in 2016, 50th in 2017, 43rd in 2018, and 51-100th in 2019. The University of Sydney has been 151-200th in the Academic Ranking of World Universities in chemistry since its inception in 2017. In 2018, U.S. News & World Report ranked the School of Chemistry, University of Sydney 138th in the world and 6th in Australia.

Notable people

 Adrien Albert
 Albert Ernest Alexander
 Jane Foss Barff
 Henry H. Bauer
 James K. Beattie
 Arthur Birch
 Alexander Boden
 Brice Bosnich
 Mary Elizabeth Brown
 A. David Buckingham
 Samuel Warren Carey
 Warwick Cathro
 John Cornforth
 James Charles Cox
 David P. Craig
 Liz Dennis
 Francis Patrick Dwyer
 Jane Dyson
 Michelle Engelsman
 David Foster
 Hans Freeman
 Joan Maie Freeman
 Philip A. Gale
 Ruth Gall
 Robert Gilbert
 Frederick Bickell Guthrie
 Margaret Harding
 George Harker
 Rita Harradence
 Noel Hush
 Joseph Jacobs
 T. H. Laby
 Raymond Le Fèvre
 Don Levy
 Leonard Francis Lindoy
 Archibald Liversidge
 Lew Mander
 Thomas Maschmeyer
 Betty R. Moore
 P. A. P. Moran
 Alice Motion
 Lionel Murphy
 Elizabeth New
 Ronald Sydney Nyholm
 Ruby Payne-Scott
 Leo Radom
 John Read
 Edward Rennie
 Ezio Rizzardo
 Robert Robinson
 Alison Rodger
 Peter Rutledge
 Henry Chamberlain Russell
 Alan Sargeson
 Roberta Shepherd
 Charles Shoppee
 Henry George Smith
 John Smith
 John McGarvie Smith
 Sever Sternhell
 Matthew H. Todd
 Jill Trewhella
 Ian Wark
 David Warren
 David Weatherburn
 Jenny Zhang

References

External links
 Facebook
 Twitter

Chemistry education
Chemistry, School of
Science and technology in Australia
Science and technology in New South Wales